The Westchester branch was a rapid transit line which was part of the Chicago "L" system from 1926 to 1951. The branch served the suburbs of Forest Park, Maywood, Bellwood, and Westchester, and consisted of nine stations. It opened on October 1, 1926 and closed on December 9, 1951.

Operations
Initially the line terminated at Roosevelt Road near Bellwood Avenue. On December 1, 1930, service was extended to Mannheim/22nd. Service on the Westchester branch ended on December 9, 1951, and was replaced by the Westchester bus route (now Pace Route 317), which largely mirrored the route of the Westchester branch, though the bus route only extended as far south as Canterbury Street.

Station listing

References

Chicago Transit Authority
Defunct railroads
Railway lines in the United States
1926 establishments in Illinois
1951 disestablishments in Illinois